Servus Credit Union is a member-owned, community-based financial institution based in Edmonton, Alberta, and in 2015 became the second largest credit union in Canada and the largest credit union in Alberta. Servus has around 380,000 members who are served by close to 2,400 employees from 100 locations in 59 communities across Alberta and as of 2021 has $17.2 billion in assets under its administration.

History 
Servus was created through the merger of several smaller, regional credit unions in Alberta, the largest being Capital City Savings & Credit Union, based in Edmonton, which was formed in 1938. The various branches, however, have separate histories going back to 1937.

On November 1, 2008, it became Canada's first province-wide credit union when it amalgamated with Community Savings and Common Wealth Credit Union.

Structure 
As a credit union Servus does not have shareholders, rather to do business with Servus customers must become members of the credit union. Member-ownership in Servus Credit Union is represented by the purchase of Common Shares, and this is required to open an account with the financial institution. Membership includes the right to democratically elect and run for a position on the Board of Directors.

Profit Sharing 
Instead of paying profits to shareholders, the company shares its profits with members, and paid out $54.1 million through its profit sharing program in 2018.

Profit sharing is paid to members in both cash and common shares, based on how much profit the company earns and how much its shares are worth. The Profit Share program has three parts:
 Patronage: Cash payments based on a percentage of the interest the member paid on loans and earned on deposits, plus the average balance they hold in their chequing and savings accounts. 
 Common Share dividends: Common share dividends are paid as additional common shares. 
 Investment share dividends: Dividends paid as additional investment shares that may be redeemed in cash.

The total amount of profit share paid to members is based on the credit union's financial performance each year. The Board of Directors determines the total profit share pay out at the end of the company's fiscal year (October 31).

General 
Based in Edmonton, the credit union also has regional offices in Lloydminster and Red Deer. The company provides a complete line of financial services including: loans, deposits, investments, telephone and online banking, ATMs, debit and credit cards, financial planning, insurance, trust, agricultural and commercial services.

Deposits held by Servus Credit Union are insured by the Alberta Credit Union Deposit Guarantee Corporation. This guarantee is more extensive than the $100,000 insurance carried by banks in Alberta because all deposit amounts are fully guaranteed, including accrued interest to the date of payout, and this includes chequing and savings accounts, RRSP deposits, RRIF deposits, foreign currency deposits, and term deposits, including those with terms exceeding five years.

Board of Directors 
Servus Credit Union's Board of Directors consists of 12 members from around the province, elected by the credit union's membership.

2019 Servus Credit Union Board of Directors: John Lamb (Board Chair), Amy Corrigan (Vice Chair), Danielle Ghai, Doug Bristow, Dianne Brown, Ken Cameron, Perry Dooley, Iris Evans, Doug Hastings, Jonathon Holt, Darcy Mykytyshyn, Simon Neigum, and Matthew Protti.

Executive Leadership Team 
 Ian Burns, President & CEO
 Randy Allarie, Chief Risk Officer
 Michelle Belland, Chief Transformation Officer
 Ryan Gobolos, Chief Financial Officer
 Dion Linke, Chief Operating Officer
 Atul Varde, Chief Information & Payments Officer

Awards 
Credit Union of the Year as awarded by Alberta Central at the 2014 AGM and Conference

Member of the Platinum Club of Canada's 50 Best Managed Companies eight years running (2009-2017)

Member of the Venture 250, which recognizes Alberta's highest grossing companies

Highest rated financial institution in the 2015 Alberta Venture Customer Service Survey

Global Co-operator Award, which recognizes people or organizations that help support the development of co-operatives internationally (2015)

Financials 
As of July 4, 2019, Servus reported assets of $16.4 billion, and a net income of $22.7 million (after dividends, patronage and taxes).

References

External links

Credit Union Deposit Gurarantee Corporation

Credit unions of Canada
Financial services companies based in Alberta
Companies based in Edmonton
Banks established in 1938
1938 establishments in Alberta